Harford is a hamlet and civil parish located approximately  north of the town of Ivybridge in the county of Devon, England. The parish lies in the local government district of the South Hams, which is a localised, second-tier governmental division of the non-metropolitan county of Devon, administered by Devon County Council.

With a parish population of just 77 people, it is the smallest civil parish in the South Hams by number of people. Part of the village (now town) of Ivybridge — the district's largest civil parish with 12,056 people — used to lye in the parish boundaries of Harford, until the parish of St John's was formed in 1836 (later renamed the parish of Ivybridge in 1894).

References 

Hamlets in Devon
Civil parishes in South Hams